is a passenger railway station located in the city of Iyo, Ehime Prefecture, Japan. It is operated by JR Shikoku and has the station number "U07".

Lines
Only local trains serve the station. Connections with other services are needed to travel further east of Matsuyama on the line.

Layout
The station, which is unstaffed, consists of a side platform serving a single track on an embankment. There is no station building, only a shelter for waiting passengers. A flight of steps leads up to the platform from the access road, rendering the station wheelchair inaccessible.

History
Iyo-Ōhira Station was opened by Japanese National Railways (JNR) on 3 March 1986. With the privatization of JNR on 1 April 1987, control of the station passed to JR Shikoku.

Surrounding area
 Japan National Route 56
 Iyo City Minamiyamazaki Elementary School

See also
 List of railway stations in Japan

References

External links
Station timetable

Railway stations in Ehime Prefecture
Railway stations in Japan opened in 1986
Iyo, Ehime